Xu Yougang (born 9 February 1996) is a Chinese footballer who currently plays for Zhejiang Yiteng in the China League Two.

Club career
Xu Yougang started his football career in January 2015 when he was loaned to Shanghai Shenhua's satellite team CF Crack's in the Primera Regional de la Comunidad Valenciana. He returned to Shanghai Shenhua in July 2015. On 25 October 2015, he made his debut for Shenhua in the 2015 Chinese Super League against Liaoning Whowin, coming on as a substitute for Zhang Lu in the 69th minute. On 25 February 2016, Xu was loaned to China League One side Qingdao Huanghai for one season. Qingdao Huanghai extended his loan deal for another season in 2017.

In December 2017, Xu returned to Shanghai Shenhua for the 2018 season. On 13 April 2018, he scored his first goal for the club in a 2–2 home draw with Guangzhou Evergrande Taobao.

Career statistics 
Statistics accurate as of match played 31 December 2020.

References

External links
 

1996 births
Living people
Chinese footballers
Footballers from Anhui
People from Chaohu
Shanghai Shenhua F.C. players
Qingdao F.C. players
Liaoning F.C. players
Zhejiang Yiteng F.C. players
Chinese Super League players
China League One players
China League Two players
Expatriate footballers in Spain
Chinese expatriate sportspeople in Spain
Association football defenders
Footballers at the 2018 Asian Games
Asian Games competitors for China